Martin Leander Welch (1864–1935) was a fishing schooner captain out of Gloucester, Massachusetts.  He was captain of the Esperanto in 1920 when it defeated the Canadian schooner Delawana in the first International Fishing Schooner Championship Races in Halifax, Nova Scotia.

Born in Digby, Nova Scotia, he moved to Gloucester in 1880, where he commanded the schooners Lucille, Titania, Lucania, Navahoe, Killarney, Benjamin A. Smith, Esperanto, Elsie, and the motor sailer Thelma.

He died in Gloucester in 1935.

References
"Esperanto Defeats Canadian Schooner in First of 3 Races", New York Times, October 31, 1920
"Esperanto Wins Fisherman's Cup", New York Times, November 2, 1920
"Captain Marty's Great Race", The Literary Digest, November 20, 1920
 The Gloucester Book, Frank L. Cox, Gloucester, 1921
 The Book of the Gloucester Fishermen, James B. Connolly, 1927

External links
 Capt. Marty Welch

American sailors
Canadian sailors
Canadian people of Irish descent
People from Gloucester, Massachusetts
People from Digby County, Nova Scotia
1864 births
1935 deaths